University Preparatory School is a grade 6-12 college preparatory school located in Redding, California, United States established in 2004.  The school is a charter school within the Shasta Union High School District.

Located in the Shasta Learning Center, the school's facilities include three gymnasiums, a stadium with an all-weather turf field, softball and baseball fields, and 1000-seat theater.

Highly respected as one of the best 250 schools in the country, it has some of the highest AP and average SAT/ACT scores of all public high schools in the country.

Administration
Rochelle Angley is the current principal at U-Prep, in her 1st year (as of 2022) on the job. Rochelle Angley, was a former teacher at the school who served as a VP at Parsons Junior High during the 2015–16 school year. Her admin team includes assistant principal Monica Cabral and administrative intern Cory Reagan, who has been teaching Human Geography, Language Arts, and Social Studies at the school.

See also 
 Nova High School, which formerly occupied the site

References

External links
 

Public high schools in California
Charter schools in California
Public middle schools in California
2004 establishments in California